Hosenara Islam is an Indian politician. She was elected to the Assam Legislative Assembly from Mankachar in the 2001 Assam Legislative Assembly election as a member of the Nationalist Congress Party.

References

Nationalist Congress Party politicians from Assam
Living people
Year of birth missing (living people)